Aathmika is an Indian actress and model who works in Tamil cinema. She is known for her debut role in the film Meesaya Murukku (2017).

Early life 
Aathmika was born in Coimbatore  She moved to Chennai to complete her graduation from M.O.P. Vaishnav College for Women. Her father died on 26 June 2020.

Career 
Aathmika began her acting career by acting in a short film directed by Rajiv Menon. Her interest in acting began in college where she had been part of few short films and did a couple of modelling assignments. She was then given the female lead role in Meesaya Murukku by Adhi of Hiphop Tamizha who found her profile online. Aathmika received a good response for her performance in that film. She signed her second film Naragasooran, directed by Karthik Naren, in 2017. In the same year she was a judge at the OPPO Chennai Times Fresh Face 2017.

In 2018, Aathmika replaced Oviya in Kaatteri among the three female lead roles. In February 2019, she joined actor Udhayanidhi Stalin in Mu. Maran's Kannai Nambathey. In September 2020, Aathmika began filming for Kodiyil Oruvan, directed by Anand Krishnan. The film was released in 2021, becoming her second release due to her previous films' release being delayed.

Filmography

References

External links 
 
 

21st-century Indian actresses
Actresses in Tamil cinema
Indian film actresses
Living people
Year of birth missing (living people)